Placentia may refer to:

 Palace of Placentia, an English royal palace
 Placentia, California, United States
 Placentia, Italy, a Roman city known today as Piacenza
 Placentia, Newfoundland and Labrador, Canada
 Battle of Placentia (disambiguation)
 Placentia Bay
 , the name of two ships of the Royal Navy

See also

 Placencia, Belize
 Plasencia, Extremadura, Spain
 Plentzia, Basque Country, Spain
 Piacenza (disambiguation)
 Plaisance (disambiguation), a French word
 Not to be confused with Placenta